Marxism, Freedom and the State is a 63-page non-fiction book by Russian revolutionary, anarchist and philosopher Michael Bakunin. It was translated into English in 1950.

Publication and translation 
It was translated into English by Kenneth Kenafick in 1950 and published by the UK's Freedom Press in London. The book has 63 pages.

Marxism, Freedom and the State is published as a series of essays that were written following disagreements between Bakunin and Karl Marx in the early 1870s. The book was published just after Bakunin was expelled from The International.

Synopsis 
Marxism, Freedom and the State critiques the leadership elements of Marxism and promotes consensus decision making between workers. He labels Karl Marx as an intellectual and bourgeoisie who looked down on members of the working class saw them as unable to lead themselves. He agrees with Marx's critique of the capitalist economics.

Bakunin describes the nation state as an oppressive concept that should be rejected, and critiques socialists for their attempts to do so, a concept he calls "Red Bureaucracy."

References

External links 

 Marxism, Freedom and the State, as translated by Kenafick

1870s non-fiction books
Books about Karl Marx
Books about Marxism
Books about political power
Books about anarchism
Books about socialism